Muintir na Tíre (meaning "People of the Country") is a national Irish voluntary organisation that promotes community and rural development. 

Canon John Hayes founded the organisation in 1937.

Past presidents
Canon John Hayes Founder: 1937-1957
Canon Maurice Morrissey 1957-1963
Very Rev. Ray Browne 1963-1967
Very Rev. Patrick Purcell 1967-1971
Con Lucey 1973-1976
Very Rev. John Stapleton 1976-1980
Michael J. Lynch 1980-1983 & 1986-1994
Lt. Col. Jim O’Brien 1983-1984
Sean Hegarty 1984-1986 & 2001-2004
Jim Quigley 1994-2001
Margaret O’Doherty 2004-2007
Martin Quinn 2008-2011

The list was compiled from a picture supplied by Tom Fitzgerald, the Chief Administrative Officer from 1947 to his retirement.

References

External links
 Muintir na Tíre website

Non-profit organisations based in the Republic of Ireland
Development charities based in the Republic of Ireland
Organizations established in 1937
Agrarianism in Ireland